The Ladin Wikipedia is the Ladin-language edition of Wikipedia, a free, open-content encyclopedia. It reached 10,000 articles in January 2022 and 40,000 in June 2022.

The Ladin Wikipedia should not be confused with the Ladino Wikipedia (another name for Judaeo-Spanish Wikipedia) or the Latin Wikipedia.

History 
The Ladin Wikipedia started as a project on Wikimedia Incubator in 2005. Due to the existence of many dialects of the ladin language and weak spread in standard ladin usage, it took a long time to become a definitive project of Wikipedia: about 15 years from the creation of the project and 3 years from the beginning of the participation of the institutions. In fact it reached its first 1000 articles on 14 November 2019, while it was still a test wiki on Wikimedia Incubator.

Features 
The articles can be written in standard ladin (Ladin Dolomitan) or in one of the five different dialects: Gherdëina, Badiot, Fascian, Fodom, Anpezan (the latter two are almost never used).

Because of linguistical reasons, it is closely related to Romansh Wikipedia and Friulian Wikipedia.

The Ladin Wikipedia has one of the highest article per speaker ratios with over three articles for each native speaker.

References 

Wikipedias by language
Wikipedias in Romance languages